Cami Li (born Camila Figueras), is an alternative model, reality TV personality and television host.

She is of Cuban ancestry and was born in Puerto Rico. She lives between Miami and Las Vegas.  In 2015, she took part in Celebrity Big Brother 15. She was the fifth housemate to be evicted and subsequently finished in 8th place. She was also on CodeBabes. Later on in 2015, Cami-Li appeared on MTV's Ex on the Beach as an ex of Kirk Norcross, who was also a participant in the show.

On July 5, 2017 it was announced that she was engaged to be married to her boyfriend Brent.

In 2018, she appeared in episode 3 of season 16 of Say Yes to the Dress. In 2019, Cami returned to the series for episode 1 of season 17.

Early life
When Li was a child, her sister, 21, was killed by a criminal on the run from the police. Li said that the early tragedy inspired her to become a lawyer ‘because the injustice of the trial was just ridiculous.'

References

1986 births
Living people
Puerto Rican television personalities
People from Miami
People from San Juan, Puerto Rico
Puerto Rican female models
Television personalities from Florida